The 1962–63 season was Stoke City's 56th season in the Football League and the 23rd in the Second Division. 1963 was also Stoke's centenary year which was celebrated with a friendly match at the Victoria Ground against Spanish giants Real Madrid.

In the club's centenary year Stoke managed to finally achieve promotion back to the top flight after a ten-year absence. Despite a slow start Stoke went on two fantastic unbeaten runs and although there was a nervy end to the season a Stanley Matthews inspired 2–0 over Luton Town in the final home match secured Stoke both promotion to the First Division and the Second Division title.

Season review

League
The 1962–63 season saw Stoke officially celebrate its centenary and the hope from the supporters was that it would be marked by promotion. A failure to win any of their first six matches caused a few grumblings from the fans but a four-goal haul from Dennis Viollet helped Stoke beat Charlton Athletic 6–3 to set the tone for the season. Keith Bebbington and Eddie Clamp joined the club as well as Stoke's first African footballer, Eddie Stuart from South Africa.

From late August to 8 December Stoke went 18 matches unbeaten and were now regarded as one of the promotion favourites. The run came to an end away at Leeds United ten days before Christmas but after winning at Rotherham United on Boxing Day, the season came to a halt as one of the worst winters on record gripped the country. After two months without football Stoke played again on 2 March and easily beat Walsall 3–0. Just after this match Waddington pulled off another impressive transfer when he signed Northern Ireland and Burnley striker Jimmy McIlroy for £25,000 much to the bewilderment of the Burnley fans who regarded McIlroy as their best player. But his debut for Stoke ended in disaster as Stoke crashed to a 6–0 defeat at Norwich City. Thankfully for Stoke that awful result was quickly forgotten as they strung together six successive wins and so entered the final run of matches in fine form.

A draw at Roker Park was quickly followed by victories over Cardiff City and Sunderland at home while a vital point was gain in a thrilling 3–3 draw at Huddersfield Town. Three straight defeats caused some concern but a 1–0 win at Chelsea meant that Stoke were within one win of gaining a return to the First Division. And so over 12,000 Stoke fans made the trip to Bury to see them gain promotion at Gigg Lane but it did not go well and the "Shakers" certainly stirred things up by winning 2–1 to put the celebrations on hold. For the penultimate match against Luton Town at the Victoria Ground a crowd of 33,644 turned up to see if Stoke could gain promotion. Jackie Mudie gave Stoke the lead and then Stanley Matthews sealed the promotion in typical Matthews style as he dribbled around Town 'keeper Ron Baynham to send the home crowd ecstatic and end ten years in the Second Division.

On 24 April 1963 Stoke arranged a friendly with the famous Real Madrid. The match was seen as the celebration for the club's centenary. The match finished 2–2 with Dennis Viollet and Jimmy McIlroy scoring for Stoke while Félix Ruiz and Ferenc Puskás scored for Real.

FA Cup
Stoke lost at the first attempt against Leeds United but it was seen as a blessing in disguise by the management as they wanted to concentrate on gaining promotion.

League Cup
After beating Walsall, Stoke lost 3–1 away at Aston Villa.

Final league table

Results

Stoke's score comes first

Legend

Football League Second Division

FA Cup

League Cup

Friendlies

Squad statistics

References

External links

Stoke City F.C. seasons
Stoke